Italy hosted the Eurovision Song Contest 2022 in Turin, having won  with "" by Måneskin. Italian broadcaster RAI announced that the winning performer(s) of the Sanremo Music Festival 2022, later turning out to be Mahmood and Blanco with "", would earn the right to represent the nation at the contest. As both the host country and a member of the "Big Five", Italy automatically qualified to the final.

Background 

Prior to the 2022 contest, Italy has participated in the Eurovision Song Contest forty-six times since its first entry at the inaugural contest in 1956. Italy has withdrawn from the Eurovision Song Contest a number of times, with their most recent absence spanning from 1998 until 2010. A number of top 10 placements followed in the next editions, culminating with their victory in 2021.

Between 2011 and 2013 and since 2015, the Sanremo Music Festival has regularly been used to select the Italian entrant to the contest, at first through an intermediate stage of internal selection among the contestants, and after 2014 (when a full internal selection took place), the winner of the festival has always earned the right of first refusal to represent Italy in the Eurovision Song Contest.

Before Eurovision

Artist selection

Italian broadcaster RAI confirmed that the performer that would represent Italy at the Eurovision Song Contest 2022 would be selected from the competing artists at the Sanremo Music Festival 2022, the 72nd edition of the event. According to the rules of Sanremo 2022, the winner of the festival earns the right to represent Italy at the Eurovision Song Contest, but in case the artist is not available or refuses the offer, the organisers of the event reserve the right to choose another participant via their own criteria. The competition took place between 1 and 5 February 2022 with the winner being selected on the last day of the festival.

For the third year in a row, Amadeus served as the artistic director and presenter of Sanremo, and was joined on stage by Ornella Muti, Lorena Cesarini, Drusilla Foer, Maria Chiara Giannetta and Sabrina Ferilli, each on a different night. 25 artists, three of which directly qualifying from the newcomers' section  (held on 15 December 2021), competed in the festival. This took place over the course of five consecutive nights, articulated as follows:
 On each of the first two nights, half of the entrants performed their songs, and were judged by three separate panels from a jury of journalists.
 On the third night, all of the songs were performed and voted through a 50/50 split system by means of televoting and a demoscopic jury. The results were combined with those of the previous nights.
 On the fourth night, the contestants each performed a cover of a song, and were voted by the same system used on the first three nights.
 On the last night, the 25 entries were once again performed, going through televoting alone, to be added up to the results obtained that far; ultimately, a final voting round (again a sum of televoting and the two juries) was held among the top 3, which determined the winner.

The first 22 competing artists were announced on 4 December 2021. Six former Eurovision Song Contest entrants were among the competing artists: Iva Zanicchi, Gianni Morandi, Massimo Ranieri ( and ), Emma, Fabrizio Moro and Mahmood. On 15 December, the three artists qualifying from the  section were announced, alongside the titles of all 25 competing songs. Entrant Achille Lauro would later be selected in the Sammarinese national final on 19 February 2022.

Final 
The 25 Big Artists each performed their entry again for a final time on 5 February 2022. A combination of public televoting, press jury voting and demoscopic jury voting selected the top three to face a superfinal vote, then the winner of Sanremo 2022 was decided by a combination of public televoting (34%), demoscopic jury voting (33%) and press jury voting (33%). Mahmood and Blanco were declared the winners of the contest with the song "".

At Eurovision 
According to Eurovision rules, all nations with the exceptions of the host country and the "Big Five" (France, Germany, Italy, Spain and the United Kingdom) are required to qualify from one of two semi-finals in order to compete for the final; the top ten countries from each semi-final progress to the final. As both the host country and a member of the "Big Five", Italy automatically qualified to compete in the final. In addition to its participation in the final, Italy was also required to broadcast and vote in one of the two semi-finals. This was decided via a draw held during the semi-final allocation draw on 25 January 2022, when it was announced that Italy would be voting in the first semi-final.

At the close of the voting, Italy finished in sixth place overall with 268 points.

Voting

Points awarded to Italy

Points awarded by Italy

Detailed voting results
The following members comprised the Italian jury:
 Andrea Spinelli - Artist
 Cinzia Poli - Radio host, designer
 Filippo Solibello - Radio host
 Monica Agostini - TV journalist
 Paolo Di Gioia - Musician

References

2022
Countries in the Eurovision Song Contest 2022
Eurovision